Tang Frères ("Tang Brothers") is an Asian supermarket chain based in the 13th arrondissement of Paris, one of the quartier chinois (Chinatown) of the capital city of France.

Tang Frères is known as the biggest Asian supermarket chain west of China. The company has in fact diversified to other activities, including import of Asian DVDs and TV broadcasting. Tang Frères has several retail outlets throughout Paris and its immediate suburbs, as well as an outlet in Vientiane, the capital of Laos – the country of origin of the company's founding brothers.

Next to the Ivry's Tang Frères supermarket lies Paristore, another major Asian supermarket from France.

References

External links

 Tang Frères website (Archive) 

Retail companies established in 1976
Asian-French culture
Shops in Paris
Supermarkets of France
13th arrondissement of Paris